Jean-Marie Queneau (21 March 1934 – 16 February 2022) was a French painter, engraver, and editor.

Biography
Jean-Marie was the son of the writer Raymond Queneau and his wife, Janine Kahn. He studied in Paris under the likes of artist Paul Colin. He began to paint while working at the Cinémathèque Française, and Hachette.

Queneau began exhibiting in 1958 within France and abroad. His paintings were referenced in works by the likes of Marguerite Duras, Patrick Waldberg, Camille Bourniquel, Jacques Réda, Thomas Owen, Claude Esteban, and others. His works were largely centered around literature, with one of his favorite subjects being libraries.

Queneau died on 16 February 2022, at the age of 87.

References

1934 births
2022 deaths
20th-century French engravers
20th-century French male artists
20th-century French painters
21st-century French engravers
21st-century French male artists
21st-century French painters
Artists from Paris
French editors